Patrolling is a military tactic. Small groups or individual units are deployed from a larger formation to achieve a specific objective and then return.  The tactic of patrolling may be applied to ground troops, armored units, naval units, and combat aircraft. The duration of a patrol will vary from a few hours to several weeks depending on the nature of the objective and the type of units involved.

There are several different types of patrol each with a different objective. The most common is to collect information by carrying out a reconnaissance patrol. Such a patrol may try to remain clandestine and observe an enemy without themselves being detected.  Other reconnaissance patrols are overt, especially those that interact with the civilian population.

Patrol types

A combat patrol is a group with sufficient size (usually platoon or company) and resources to raid or ambush a specific enemy.  It primarily differs from an attack in that the aim is not to hold ground.

A clearing patrol is a brief patrol around a newly occupied defensive position in order to ensure that the immediate area is secure. Clearing patrols are often undertaken on the occupation of a location, and during stand to in the transition from night to day routine and vice versa.

A standing patrol is a static patrol, probably known as an OP/LP(Observation Post/Listening post) in US and NATO terminology. Standing patrols are usually small (half section/section) static patrols intended to provide early warning, security or to guard some geographical feature, such as dead ground.

A reconnaissance (recce) patrol is a patrol, usually small whose main mission is the gathering of information. Generally speaking recce patrols tend to avoid contact, although it is not unknown for recon patrols to "fight for information".

A screening patrol combines a number of patrols to 'screen' a large area. This type of patrol is used by armored formations in desert theaters, and also by ground troops operating in urban areas. A screen is generally composed of a number of static observation posts.

See also
List of military tactics
Observation post
Maritime patrol

References

External links

Patrolling magazine, 75th Ranger Regiment Association

Military tactics
Reconnaissance